Potok is a village in Croatia in the municipality of Popovača. It is connected by the D36 highway.

References

Populated places in Sisak-Moslavina County